BARELY ALIVE in Grand Rapids, Michigan 12/30/12 is the first live album by rock group Cheap Girls. It was released digitally on February 5, 2013, and is the first release on the band's own record label, Business Casual.

Recording
The album was recorded on December 30, 2012, at The Intersection in Grand Rapids, Michigan.

Release
The announcement for the album came on February 1, 2013. It is only scheduled to be released digitally.

Track listing

References

2013 live albums
Cheap Girls albums